Puma Peak is the unofficial name of a mountain located in Alberta, Canada. It is the second tallest mountain in the Palliser Range in the Canadian Rockies.

See also
 Geography of Alberta

References

Three-thousanders of Alberta
Alberta's Rockies